The 2012 Dick Smith Sandown 500 was a motor race for the Australian sedan-based V8 Supercars. It was the tenth event of the 2012 International V8 Supercars Championship. It was held on the weekend of 14–16 September at the Sandown Raceway, in Melbourne, Victoria.

It was the 42nd event to be held in the history of the Sandown 500 and the first to be held for V8 Supercars since 2007.

Craig Lowndes won his fifth Sandown 500, while co-driver Warren Luff broke through for his first victory in V8 Supercars, with the duo taking their Triple Eight Race Engineering Holden Commodore to the win over the Ford Performance Racing pair of Mark Winterbottom and Steven Richards.

This was the first endurance race held at the Sandown circuit to have a race average speed above 150 km/h. The 2012 record was finally broken in 2018.

Results

Sandown 500

Race

Standings
 After 20 of 30 races.

External links
 Official race results

References

Dick Smith
Motorsport at Sandown
Pre-Bathurst 500